Evelina Raselli (born 3 May 1992) is a Swiss retired ice hockey forward.

She has represented Switzerland at the Winter Olympics in 2014, 2018, and 2022.  She won the bronze medal after defeating Sweden in the bronze medal playoff in 2014.  The team also finished fifth in 2018, and fourth in 2022.

She was selected by the Boston Pride in the 2021 NWHL International Draft on 25 July 2021.

In November 2022, she announced her retirement.

References

External links

1992 births
Living people
People from Poschiavo
Ice hockey players at the 2014 Winter Olympics
Ice hockey players at the 2018 Winter Olympics
Ice hockey players at the 2022 Winter Olympics
Medalists at the 2014 Winter Olympics
Olympic bronze medalists for Switzerland
Olympic ice hockey players of Switzerland
Olympic medalists in ice hockey
Swiss women's ice hockey forwards
Sportspeople from Graubünden